Ye Fei (7 May 1914 – 18 April 1999) was a Philippine-born Chinese military general and politician of the People's Republic of China. Born Sixto Mercado Tiongco in the Philippines to a Chinese father and a Filipino mother, he joined the Chinese Communist Party at a young age and fought many battles as a senior commander of the People's Liberation Army in the Chinese Civil War. At age 40, he was among the first PLA commanders to be awarded the rank of General by the newly established People's Republic of China and later served as Commander-in-Chief of the Chinese Navy. He also served in a number of civilian posts including Governor and Communist Party Chief of Fujian Province, and Minister of Transport.

Early life

Birth in the Philippines
Ye Fei was born Sixto Mercado Tiongco on 7 May 1914 in the town of Tiaong in the then-named Tayabas Province, in the Philippines. His father was Yap Sun Uy (葉蓀衛; Yap is the Minnan pronunciation of the Chinese surname Ye), a Chinese merchant from Nan'an, Fujian Province who had moved to the Philippines in 1900 and adopted the Philippine name Tiongco. Yap converted to Catholicism in order to get approval of the parents to marry Ye Fei's mother Francisca Mercado, a Filipina from a local Catholic family. Ye Fei's original Chinese name was Ye Qiheng.

Youth in China
In 1919 Ye Fei, then four years old, and his older brother Ye Qicun, were brought by their father to his Chinese hometown for schooling. Starting in 1926 he attended Zhongshan Middle School in Xiamen and then the Thirteenth High School of Fujian.

Ye Fei joined the underground Communist Youth League of China in May 1928, and the Chinese Communist Party in March 1932. In 1932 he was arrested by the Kuomintang government of the Republic of China and sentenced to a year in prison.  As he was a Philippine citizen, his parents managed to arrange for his extradition to the Philippines (then a United States territory under the Insular Government of the Philippine Islands), and his mother set out for China to take him back.  However, by the time Francisca Mercado reached Hong Kong, Ye Fei was already released from prison. Telling his mother that he was going to study in Japan, he instead went to Fujian to help establish the Communist guerrilla there.

Wartime career

Chinese Civil War

In 1934 the Communist Chinese Red Army suffered a series of defeats by Chiang Kai-shek's Kuomintang forces, and started the Long March.  With the escape of the Communist leadership from neighbouring Jiangxi Province to remote Shaanxi Province, Ye Fei's Eastern Fujian guerrilla was cut off from the main Communist forces and fought in isolation for three years. His older brother Ye Qicun was killed in the late 1930s by the Kuomintang.

Second Sino-Japanese War
After the eruption of the Second Sino-Japanese War, the civil war between the Communists and Kuomintang was suspended, and the two parties agreed to form a Second United Front to fight the invading Japanese.  Ye Fei was made a regiment commander in the newly formed New Fourth Army and moved to the Jiangnan region to continue his guerrilla warfare, this time against the Japanese occupying force.  His early activities included 1939 attacks on the Japanese-controlled Shanghai–Nanjing Railway and Shanghai Hongqiao Airport.

In 1940 Ye Fei moved across the Yangtze River to northern Jiangsu Province to continue fighting the Japanese as well as the Kuomintang, the nominal ally of the Communists.  He was appointed the commander of the first column of the Northern Jiangsu division of the New Fourth Army under the leadership of Su Yu.  In October, he annihilated a Kuomintang brigade in the Battle of Huangqiao.  In 1944, he commanded the Communist force in the Battle of Cheqiao defeating the Japanese.  The next year he was appointed commander of the Central Jiangsu military region and deputy commander of the Jiangsu-Zhejiang military region.

Resumption of Civil War
After the surrender of Japan at the end of World War II, talks between the Communists and the Kuomintang broke down and the Chinese Civil War resumed.  As a senior commander Ye Fei participated in numerous battles including the Menglianggu Campaign and the Huaihai Campaign.  In February 1949 he was appointed Commander of the 10th Army Group of the People's Liberation Army.

In April 1949 Ye Fei's forces attacked HMS Amethyst on the Yangtze River, and forced her to remain anchored for 40 days (see main article: Yangtze Incident).

After participating in the Battle of Shanghai (1949) in May 1949, Ye Fei, with Wei Guoqing as political commissar, led the 10th Army Group in the battles of Fuzhou, Zhangzhou, and Xiamen, taking over most of Fujian Province from the Kuomintang defenders. However, his forces suffered a major defeat in the Battle of Guningtou, during which more than ten thousand PLA soldiers were killed or captured when they landed on Kinmen Island off the Fujian coast.  The Communists were never able to take over Kinmen and to this day Kinmen remains under the administration of the Republic of China (Taiwan).  Ye Fei partially redeemed for the loss by winning the Dongshan Island Campaign in July 1953.

Peacetime career
In 1953 Ye Fei was appointed Communist Party Chief and Governor of Fujian Province.  He also concurrently served as deputy commander of the Nanjing Military Region.  In 1955, at age 40, he was among the first group of People's Liberation Army commanders to be awarded the rank of General. From 1 July 1956, with the creation of the Fuzhou Military Region, he became its first commander.

During the Cultural Revolution Ye Fei suffered from persecution for his overseas ties, but was rehabilitated in 1975 and appointed China's Minister of Transport.  He held the position until February 1979, when he was appointed by Deng Xiaoping as the political commissar of the People's Liberation Army Navy, despite having never served in the Navy before.  The following year he was promoted to the position of Commander-in-Chief of the Navy, which he held until August 1982.  From 1983 to 1993 he served as the vice-chairman of the Standing Committee of the 6th and the 7th National People's Congress.

Return to the Philippines
At the invitation of then-President Corazon Aquino, Ye Fei visited the Philippines in February 1989 as the vice-chairman of the Chinese Congress. This was the first time he returned to the country of his birth since leaving almost 70 years before. He spent two weeks in the country, visiting his parents' graves in Tiaong and having a reunion with his younger siblings, who were born after he left for China and had little idea of their brother's achievements.

Opposition to army crackdown in Tiananmen Square
During the Tiananmen Square protests of spring 1989, Ye Fei signed a letter opposing the enforcement of martial law by the Army in Beijing.

Death and monument
Ye Fei died in Beijing on 18 April 1999, aged 84. On 29 March 2000, a memorial park in Tiaong was dedicated to Ye Fei, including a monument and a vocational school. Present at the inauguration were General Angelo Reyes, Foreign Secretary Domingo Siazon, Jr., Interior Secretary Alfredo Lim, and Chinese ambassador Fu Ying. This was the first in a series of events celebrating 25 years of diplomatic relations between the Philippines and the People's Republic of China.

References 

1914 births
1999 deaths
Tagalog people
People from Quezon
Former Roman Catholics
People extradited from China
People extradited to the Philippines
Filipino people of Chinese descent
Chinese military personnel of World War II
People's Liberation Army generals
Commanders of the People's Liberation Army Navy
Governors of Fujian
Presidents of Huaqiao University
Ministers of Transport of the People's Republic of China
Vice Chairpersons of the National People's Congress
Commanders of the Fuzhou Military Region
Political commissars of the People's Liberation Army Navy
20th-century Chinese military personnel